Punalur Balan (1927–1987) was an Indian writer and a poet in Malayalam. He was born on 3 January 1927 in Punalur, Kollam district, Kerala. From his student days he was associated with the Communist movement and shot to fame during  the 'Pink Decade' in Malayalam poetry.

Balan wrote lyrics and songs profusely for the cultural forums of the Communist Party and when the Kerala People's Arts Club (KPAC) staged its first play Ente Makananu Sari Balan penned the lyrics. After taking his B.A. and B.Ed. he became a school teacher. He took his M.A. in Malayalam and became a journalist. Later he joined the State Institute of Languages as a Research Officer. Kerala Sahitya Academy award  was given to his collection Kottayile Pattu in 1975.

His poems are marked by a unique force which stems from the use of condensed language aimed at expressing the subtle human experiences of the modern man viewed through  the Marxist angle tinged with piercing social satire.

He died on 19 March 1987.

Selected works
Thudikkunna Thaalukal
Raaman Raaghavan
Kottayile Paattu
Mruthasanjeevani
Aram
Iruttil Pothinja Thirinaalam

References
Punalur Balan Porushathinte Shakthigaadha, Vilakkudi Rajendran; Current Books, Thrissur.
Malayala Kavitha Sahithya Charithram, M. Leelavathy, Kerala Sahithya Akademy, Thrissur.
 </ref>

External links
www.kerala.gov.in

1927 births
1987 deaths
Malayalam-language writers
Malayalam poets
Indian Marxist poets
Indian Communist poets
Sree Narayana College, Kollam alumni
People from Kollam district
Recipients of the Kerala Sahitya Akademi Award
20th-century Indian poets
Poets from Kerala
Indian male poets